Henry de Pinkeney (died 1254), Lord of Weden-Pinkeney, Fulmer and Datchet in England and Lord of Crawford in Scotland, was a 13th-century English noble.

Henry was the son of Robert de Pinkeney, Lord of Wedon-Pinkeney. He succeeded to his father's estates and titles upon the death of his father in 1234.

Marriage and issue
Henry married Alice, daughter of David de Lindsay, Justiciar of Lothian in 1247 and Marjorie of Huntingdon, they are known to have had the following issue:
Henry de Pinkeney, married Mary de Wahull, had issue.
Alice de Pinkeney, married Ralph de Throp, had issue.
Agnes de Pinkeney, married John de Wahull, had issue.

Citations

References

 

13th-century English people
Year of birth unknown
1254 deaths